Union is a town in Saint Patrick Parish, Grenada.  It is located towards the northern end of the island.

References

Populated places in Grenada